Fauteux is a French surname. It may refer to:

Aegidius Fauteux (1876–1941), Canadian journalist, librarian, and historian
André Fauteux (born 1947), Canadian sculptor
Claire Fauteux (1890–1988), Canadian painter, illustrator, and author
Gaspard Fauteux (1898–1963), Canadian politician; brother of Gérald Fauteux
Gérald Fauteux (1900–1980), Canadian Chief Justice and university chancellor; brother of Gaspard Fauteux
Guillaume-André Fauteux (1874–1940), Canadian politician
Henriette Fauteux-Massé (1924–2005), Canadian painter
Jacques Fauteux (1933–2009), Canadian radio and television announcer and presenter
Roger Fauteux (born 1923), Canadian artist

French-language surnames